Robert "Rob" Reekers (born 7 May 1966) is a retired Dutch footballer who played in the Netherlands for FC Twente and in Germany for ASC Schöppingen, VfL Bochum and FC Gütersloh. He earned four caps for the Dutch national side between 1988 and 1989. After retiring as a player in 2000, Reekers has managed Rot-Weiß Oberhausen, FC Gütersloh and SuS Stadtlohn.

Reekers worked by the end of June 2009 to June 2012 as Assistant coach of Jos Luhukay at FC Augsburg. For the 2012–13 season, he moved with him to Hertha BSC.

Reekers is one of a small number of Dutch footballers to be selected for the Dutch national team while never having played in the Dutch Eredivisie. The others capped players are Jordi Cruyff, Jerrel Hasselbaink, Willi Lippens, Wim Hofkens, Nathan Aké, Timothy Fosu-Mensah and Javairô Dilrosun.

Honours
 Oberliga Westfalen: champion 1985–86
 DFB-Pokal: runner-up 1987–88
 2. Bundesliga: champion 1993–94
 Regionalliga West/Südwest: champion 1995–96

References

External links
 
 

1966 births
Living people
Footballers from Enschede
Dutch footballers
Netherlands international footballers
Dutch football managers
Dutch expatriate football managers
FC Twente players
ASC Schöppingen players
VfL Bochum players
FC Gütersloh 2000 players
Bundesliga players
2. Bundesliga players
Expatriate football managers in Azerbaijan
FC Gütersloh 2000 managers
Rot-Weiß Oberhausen managers
Association football defenders
SuS Stadtlohn managers
Dutch expatriate sportspeople in Germany
Dutch expatriate sportspeople in Azerbaijan
Expatriate football managers in Germany
Expatriate footballers in Germany
Dutch expatriate footballers